Saint Kitts and Nevis observes Atlantic Standard Time (UTC−4) year-round.

IANA time zone database 
In the IANA time zone database, Saint Kitts and Nevis is given one zone in the file zone.tab—America/Port_of_Spain, which is synonymous with the zone for time in Trinidad and Tobago. Saint Lucia and Saint Vincent and the Grenadines also share America/Port_of_Spain. Data for America/Port_of_Spain directly from zone.tab of the IANA time zone database; columns marked with * are the columns from zone.tab itself:

References

External links 
Current time in Saint Kitts and Nevis at Time.is
Time in Saint Kitts and Nevis at TimeAndDate

Time in Saint Kitts and Nevis